Gook is an ethnic slur primarily, but not exclusively, referring to Asians. 

Gook or GOOK may also refer to:

People
 Arthur Charles Gook (1883–1959), English evangelical Christian, writer and translator
 Bert Gook (c. 1914–1964), Australian rules footballer
 Roosevelt Gook, a pseudonym for Al Kooper (born Alan Peter Kuperschmidt in 1944), American songwriter, record producer and musician

Other uses
 Gook (headgear), worn by women mining manual labourers in Cornwall and Devon
 Gook (film), a 2017 American drama about two Korean-American brothers
 Kang Gook, a main character in Ireland, a 2004 South Korean television series
 Gook Creek, Michigan, United States
 GOOK, ICAO airport code for Kaolack Airport, Kaolack, Senegal

See also
 Guk, a class of soup-like dishes in Korean cuisine